Charley is the twentieth studio album by American country music artist Charley Pride. It was released in May 1975 via RCA Victor Records and was produced by Jack Clement. The record was Pride's twentieth studio album released in his career and contained a total of ten tracks. The album included two singles which became major hits that year on the country chart: "I Ain't All Bad" and "Hope You're Feelin' Me (Like I'm Feelin' You)."

Background and content
Charley Pride had nearly a decade of country music success by 1975. This included a string of number one hits during this period, including "It's Gonna Take a Little Bit Longer," "She's Too Good to Be True" and "A Shoulder to Cry On." As the decade progressed, his music took more country pop style, which included this album release. Charley was recorded mostly in June 1974 at the RCA Victor Studio, which was located in Nashville, Tennessee. The recording sessions were produced by Jack Clement, Pride's longtime RCA record producer. The album contained a total of ten tracks. It contained a cover version of "She's as Close as I Can Get to Loving You," which was originally a minor hit for Hank Locklin in 1971. It also included "Lovin' Understandin' Man," which was also cut by Don Williams around the same time. The project also contained two tracks written by Johnny Duncan and one track written by Gary Stewart.

Release and reception

Charley was released on RCA Victor Records in May 1975. It was his twentieth studio recording released in his career. The album was originally distributed as a vinyl LP, with five songs on each side of the record. In the 2010s, it was re-released in a digital format to streaming services, such as Apple Music. It spent a total of 20 weeks on the Billboard Top Country Albums and peaked at number five in September.

Charley contained two singles which became top ten hits that year on the Billboard country chart. The first was "I Ain't All Bad," which was issued on RCA Victor in March 1975. The song peaked at number six on the Hot Country Songs chart by June 1975. It also reached number one on the RPM Country Singles chart in Canada. The second single released off the album was "Hope You're Feelin' Me (Like I'm Feelin' You)," which was issued in July 1975. By October of that year, it reached number one on the Billboard Hot Country Singles chart. It also became a top ten hit in Canada. Charley was only given a rating of two stars from Allmusic.

Track listing

Vinyl version

Digital version

Personnel
All credits are adapted from the liner notes of Charley.

Musical personnel
 David Briggs – piano, keyboards
 Jimmy Capps – guitar
 Johnny Gimble – fiddle
 Lloyd Green – steel guitar
 Buddy Harman – drums
 The Jordanaires – background vocals
 Charlie McCoy – harmonica
 The Nashville Edition – background vocals
 Charley Pride – lead vocals
 Hargus "Pig" Robbins – piano
 Hal Rugg – steel guitar
 Dale Sellers – guitar
 Jerry Shook – guitar
 Bobby Thompson – banjo, guitar
 Tommy Williams – fiddle
 Chip Young – guitar

Technical personnel
 Herb Burnette – art direction
 Jack Clement – producer
 John Donegan – photography
 David Roys – technician
 Roy Shockley – technician 
 Bill Vandevort – engineering

Chart performance

Release history

References

1975 albums
Albums produced by Jack Clement
Charley Pride albums
RCA Victor albums